The 2014 Suruga Bank Championship was the seventh edition of the Suruga Bank Championship, the club football match co-organized by the Japan Football Association, the football governing body of Japan, CONMEBOL, the football governing body of South America, and J. League, the professional football league of Japan, between the winners of the previous season's J. League Cup and Copa Sudamericana.

The match was contested between Japanese team Kashiwa Reysol, the 2013 J. League Cup champion, and Argentine team Lanús, the 2013 Copa Sudamericana champion. It was hosted by Kashiwa Reysol at the Hitachi Kashiwa Soccer Stadium in Kashiwa on August 6, 2014.

For the fifth consecutive year, the match was won by the Japanese host team, as Kashiwa Reysol won 2–1 to earn their first Suruga Bank Championship.

Qualified teams

Format
The Suruga Bank Championship was played as a single match, with the J. League Cup champion hosting the match. If the score was tied at the end of regulation, the penalty shoot-out was used to determine the winner (no extra time was played). A maximum of seven substitutions may be made during the match.

Match details

References

External links
スルガ銀行チャンピオンシップ2014, Japan Football Association 
スルガ銀行チャンピオンシップ, J. League 
Copa Suruga Bank, CONMEBOL.com 

2014
2014 in Japanese football
2014 in South American football
Kashiwa Reysol matches
Club Atlético Lanús matches